The 1918 United States Senate elections were held throughout 1918, the midpoint of Woodrow Wilson's second term as president. This was the first election since the enactment of the Seventeenth Amendment that all 32 Class 2 Senators were subject to direct or popular election, making them the final class under the old system of being selected by state legislatures. Special elections were also held to fill vacancies.

Republicans gained a slim 2-seat control after picking up a net 6 seats (4 in general elections and 2 in special elections). The change in control meant that the Republicans could deny entry of the United States into the League of Nations. American participation in this new international institution was the centerpiece of Wilson's post-war foreign policy.

Gains, losses, and holds

Retirements
Five Republicans and four Democrats retired instead of seeking re-election.

Defeats
Eight Democrats and one Republican sought re-election but lost in the primary or general election.

Deaths
One Democrat died on October 21st, 1917, and his seat remained vacant until an April 1918 election.

Results Summary 

These numbers represent composition at the March 4, 1919 start of the 66th United States Congress.  Composition often changes due to deaths, resignations, or party shifting.

 Majority Party: Republican (49 seats)
 Minority Party: Democratic (47 seats)
 Other Parties: 0
 Total Seats: 96

Source: United States Senate Official Website

Change in composition

Before the elections

Elections results

Complete list of races

Special elections during the 65th Congress 

In these special elections, the winner was seated during 1918 or before March 4, 1919; ordered by election date.

Elections leading to the 66th Congress 

In these general elections, the winners were elected for the term beginning March 4, 1919; ordered by state.

All of the elections involved the Class 2 seats.

Closest races 
Eighteen races had a margin of victory under 10%:

Alabama

Arkansas

Colorado

Delaware

Georgia

Idaho

Idaho (regular)

Idaho (special)

Illinois

Iowa

Kansas

Kentucky

Louisiana

Louisiana (regular)

Louisiana (special)

Maine

Massachusetts

Michigan

Minnesota

Mississippi

Missouri (special)

Montana

Nebraska

Nevada (special)

New Hampshire

New Hampshire (regular)

New Hampshire (special)

New Jersey

New Jersey (regular)

New Jersey (special)

New Mexico

North Carolina

Oklahoma

Oregon

Oregon (regular)

Oregon (special)

Rhode Island

South Carolina

South Carolina (regular)

South Carolina (special)

South Dakota

Tennessee

Texas

Virginia

West Virginia

Wisconsin (special)

Wyoming

See also 
 1918 United States elections
 1918 United States House of Representatives elections
 65th United States Congress
 66th United States Congress

Notes

References 

 
United States home front during World War I